Judith Stefania Donath (born May 7, 1962) is a fellow at Harvard's Berkman Center, and the founder of the Sociable Media Group at the MIT Media Lab. She has written papers on various aspects of the Internet and its social impact, such as Internet society and community, interfaces, virtual identity issues, and other forms of collaboration that have become manifest with the advent of connected computing.

She combines concepts from evolutionary biology, architecture, ethnography, cognitive science, and various other disciplines, to develop methodologies for optimizing the design of mediated virtual cities on the internet and online virtual identities.

She is a pioneer of online social media applications, including the first postcard application and the first interactive art show competition. Her work has been shown internationally in museums and galleries and recently at the MIT Museum as a major exhibit.

Her research work includes issues centered on "identity and deception in online communities" and the creation of multiple virtual personae. In 1999 she researched the presence of deception in the online identities of Usenet users, as well as the reconstruction of the personality of an individual using data gathered from both online and offline encounters.

Career
Donath obtained her Bachelor's degree in History from Yale and her Masters and Ph.D. degrees in Media Arts and Sciences from MIT. Her work includes the design and development of educational software and experimental media.

On October 10, 1995, while still a Ph.D. candidate at MIT, she helped organize a celebration of the tenth anniversary of the MIT Media Lab by conceiving a mass online collaboration project which featured the construction of a large website by worldwide contributors. The event was named A Day in the Life of Cyberspace and is an early example of mass collaboration on the Internet.

Her pioneering work includes the first postcard service, named The Electric Postcard, and the first interactive art show, titled Portraits in Cyberspace.

Her recent work includes directing the exhibit Id/Entity which includes collaborative works on the subject of the transformation of portraiture through the use of modern computer technology.

In her 2000 book Being Real, Donath explores the problems of cognition arising from the online behavioral dynamics of the interaction between human and possibly automated avatars in a virtual world.

She has investigated the effect of online social media on society as regards the public display of the social interconnections between the members of the online communities as a sort of "Public Displays of Connection". Her work on sociable media has applications in the field of semiotics.

On the subject of telerobotics, Donath argues that the remote manipulation afforded by the discipline may act as a desensitizing agent because the identity and human characteristics of the remote subjects of the telerobotic operation  remain unseen by the human teleoperator of the robot. She has also researched the ethnography of online communities.

Her work includes the application of architectural principles to the design of the social interaction environment of online communities in a kind of virtual city.

She has investigated  best practices for online communication and their relation to issues of embodiment, gender, sexuality and identity.

Donath has explored the use of artificial emotions in avatars and their potential use in online advertising. She predicts that artificial avatars will possess "suites of emotions" comparable to an emotional wardrobe, from which they can pick the emotion they need to "wear", depending on the circumstances. That way they can be used in advertising campaigns to target their intended audience more effectively.

In her essay "Mediated Faces" she analyzes the role of  facial representation and interpretation in an online communication environment, suggesting that there are wider possibilities for online facial representation through the use of computer-enhanced environments than a simple linear pictorial representation of the human face.

She has compared the anonymity of online flaming to the anonymity of vandalizing in real life.

Donath spoke on identity, anonymity, and the wiki at the August 2006 Wikimania conference. She returned as Fellow of Berkman Center for Internet & Society at Harvard University.

Publications (A selection)

 Donath, Judith: Identity and Deception in the Virtual Community. In M. Smith and P. Kollock (eds.) Communities in Cyberspace. London: Routledge, 1998
 Fernanda Viégas, Judith Donath: Chat Circles. ACM Conference on Computer-Human Interaction (CHI), 1999
 Judith Donath, Karrie Karahalios, Fernanda Viégas: Persistent Conversations. Journal of Computer Mediated Communication 4 (4), 1999
 Donath, Judith: Being Real. In (K. Goldberg, ed.) The Robot in the Garden: Telerobotics and Telepistemology in the Age of the Internet. Cambridge, MA: MIT Press, 2000
 Donath, Judith: 1964 Ford Falcon. In (Turkle, S., Ed) Evocative Objects: Things We Think With. Cambridge, MA: MIT Press, 2007
 The Social Machine: Designs for Living Online (The MIT Press), 2014, ISBN 978-0262027014

References

External links

 Judith Donath's homepage
 Signals, Truth, and Design, YouTube video of Donath "Google Tech Talk"

Living people
1962 births
American computer scientists
Human–computer interaction researchers
American women computer scientists
Yale College alumni
Massachusetts Institute of Technology alumni
Berkman Fellows
MIT Media Lab people
21st-century American women scientists